"Holy Wars... The Punishment Due" (also known as "Holy Wars") is a song by American thrash metal band Megadeth. Released in 1990, it is the opening track off the band's fourth studio album Rust in Peace (1990).

Music and lyrics
The song has an unusual structure: it opens with a fast thrash section, shifting at 2:26 after an acoustic bridge by Marty Friedman to a different, slower and heavier section called "The Punishment Due", interspersed by two guitar solos played by Friedman, before speeding up again with a third and final solo played during this segment by Dave Mustaine. The entire song is commonly referred to as "Holy Wars", with "The Punishment Due" referring to the heavier slower section.

The lyrics deal with global religious conflict, particularly in Israel and Northern Ireland. In an interview with the UK magazine Guitarist, Dave Mustaine said that he was inspired to write the song in Northern Ireland, when he discovered bootlegged Megadeth T-shirts were on sale and was dissuaded from taking action to have them removed on the basis that they were part of fundraising activities for "The Cause" (i.e. the Provisional Irish Republican Army). "The Punishment Due" is based on the popular Marvel comic book character, the Punisher.

Legacy
"Holy Wars... The Punishment Due" is widely considered one of Megadeth's greatest songs. In 2012, Loudwire ranked the song number one on their list of the 10 greatest Megadeth songs, and in 2018, Billboard ranked the song number two on their list of the 15 greatest Megadeth songs.

A cover version of the song is playable in the band simulation game Rock Revolution. The master recording is purchasable as part of the Rust in Peace album pack on the Rock Band band simulation platform, is playable in the Guitar Hero: Warriors of Rock game, and is available as DLC for Rocksmith 2014. The music video for "Holy Wars... The Punishment Due" was filmed in August 1990 (around the time of the Gulf War in 1990). It depicts news footage of various armed conflicts, mainly from the Middle East interspliced with footage of the band playing and Mustaine engaging in a skydive.

Accolades

Track listing
7-inch edition
"Holy Wars... The Punishment Due"
"Lucretia"

12-inch edition
"Holy Wars... The Punishment Due"
"Interview with Dave Mustaine"

12-inch edition
"Holy Wars... The Punishment Due"
"Lucretia"
"Interview with Dave Mustaine" (edited)

CD edition
"Holy Wars... The Punishment Due"
"Lucretia"
"Interview with Dave Mustaine" (edited)
Capitol Records DPRO-79462

Personnel
Dave Mustaine – lead vocals, guitar
Marty Friedman – guitar
David Ellefson – bass, backing vocals
Nick Menza – drums, percussion

Charts

Certifications

Notes

External links

Megadeth songs
1990 singles
Songs critical of religion
Protest songs
Songs about The Troubles (Northern Ireland)
Albums with cover art by Ed Repka
1990 songs
Capitol Records singles